Albert Wallis ("Allie") Lampard (3 July 1885 – 11 January 1984) was an Australian cricketer active from 1908 to 1922 who played for Victoria and the Australian Imperial Force Touring XI. He was born in Richmond, Melbourne and died in Armadale, Victoria. He appeared in 63 first-class matches as a right-handed batsman who bowled right arm leg break and googly. A genuine all rounder, he scored 2,597 runs with a highest score of 132 among three centuries and took 134 wickets with a best performance of nine for 42.

See also
 List of Victoria first-class cricketers

References

External links
 

1885 births
1984 deaths
Australian cricketers
Australian Imperial Force Touring XI cricketers
Victoria cricketers
Cricketers from Melbourne
People from Richmond, Victoria